Orgasmalgia refers to any pain that occurs at the time of orgasm.

External links

Brachytherapy treatment options

Orgasm